The N83 road is a national secondary road in Ireland that runs (north to south) from its junction with the N17 just south of Ireland West Airport Knock in County Mayo to a point just north of Tuam, County Galway where it rejoins the  N17. On 27 September 2017, the old N17 from the Kilmore Roundabout in Tuam to the junction with the N6 in Galway city was redesignated as the N83. 

See also
Roads in Ireland 
Motorways in Ireland
National primary road
Regional road

References
Roads Act 1993 (Classification of National Roads) Order 2006 – Department of Transport

National secondary roads in the Republic of Ireland
Roads in County Galway
Roads in County Mayo
Roads in County Roscommon